Jamuria Assembly constituency is an assembly constituency in Paschim Bardhaman district in the Indian state of West Bengal.

Overview
As per orders of the Delimitation Commission, No. 279 Jamuria assembly constituency covers Wards nos. 1-12, 32 of Asansol Municipal Corporation, Jamuria CD Block, and Ratibati gram panchayat of Raniganj CD Block

Jamuria assembly segment is part of No. 40 Asansol (Lok Sabha constituency).

Members of Legislative Assembly

Election results

2021

2016

2011

.# Swing calculated on Congress+Trinamool Congress vote percentages in 2006 taken together.

1977-2006
In the 2006 state assembly election, Dhirajlal Hazra of CPI (M) won the Jamuria assembly seat defeating his nearest rival Tapan Chakraborty of Trinamool Congress. Contests in most years were multi cornered but only winners and runners are being mentioned. In 2001 and 1996, Pelab Kabi of CPI (M) defeated Shiudashan Nayar of Trinamool Congress and Santosh Adhikari of Congress respectively. In 1991, 1987, 1982 and 1977, Bikash Chowdhury of CPI (M) defeated Tapas Banerjee of Congress,  Biswanath Chakraborty of Congress, Pradip Bhattacharya of ICS and Chandra Sekhar of Congress in the respective years.

1957-1972
The Jamuria seat was won by Amarendra Mondal of Congress in 1972, Durgadas Mondal of CPI (M) in 1971,  Amarendra Mondal of Congress in 1969, Tinkori Mondal of Samyukta Socialist Party in 1967, and Amarendra Mondal of Congress in 1962. Amarendra Mondal representing Praja Socialist Party had won the Jamuria seat in 1957.

References

Politics of Paschim Bardhaman district
Assembly constituencies of West Bengal